Justice Rodman may refer to:

William B. Rodman, associate justice of the North Carolina Supreme Court
William B. Rodman Jr., associate justice of the North Carolina Supreme Court